Yael Shelbia Cohen (born 31 August 2001) is an Israeli model and actress. She has appeared in a number of international modeling campaigns. She became a leading model for Israeli brands Castro from 2017 and Renuar from 2018, and currently stars in the Israeli television series Palmach on Teen Nick and Yes TV Kids.

Early life
She uses her middle name Shelbia as her professional surname, which was inherited from her Djerbian great-grandmother's Tunisian-Jewish family (of both Sephardi Jewish and Mizrahi Jewish descent). She began by uploading selfies she took by herself on Instagram shortly before her 16th birthday. As a result of finding her photos on her Instagram account, she later received an offer to take photos from the professional photographer Marina Moskowitz.

She has received additional media attention due to her Orthodox Jewish background, as she keeps Kosher and observes Shabbat, which initially had led to controversy in Shelbia's Orthodox Jewish religious community; back in her native Israel.

As of 2020, Shelbia has served as a soldier in the Israeli Air Force of the Israel Defense Forces, rather than serving in the Sherut Leumi as a civilian. The latter is what most religious Jewish girls in Israel opt to do.

Career
Her modeling soon led to controversy and opposition in her Ulpana school, which threatened to send a letter to the Israeli Education Ministry to expel her. Her family however, had been supportive of her career, so long as it would not interfere with her religious studies. And after consultation with Israel's Education Ministry, she was allowed to continue her studies on condition of following certain guidelines. However, combining a modeling career with a religious lifestyle, has led to difficulties, including in terms of modesty of clothing. During a modeling campaign in Milan, she had to live on crackers for four days, as she could not find kosher food. She says she had lost many modeling contracts back then, due to her keeping of the Sabbath and choices in clothing.

The speed of the success of her career both in Europe and Israel, has led to comparisons to fellow Israeli models Shlomit Malka, Dorit Revelis and Sofia Mechetner.

In 2018, she modelled for Kim Kardashian's brand KKW Beauty, where her photos were chosen by Kim Kardashian. In 2019, Shelbia was chosen to lead Kylie Jenner's Biotic Skincare range.

Also in 2019, she was cast for her debut acting role in a television series about the Israeli Palmach forces. It is a teen adventure period drama series set in 1946, two pivotal years before the State of Israel was founded. A seemingly innocent training farm secretly functions as a Strike Forces (also known as Palmach) training base and recruitment center for exceptional teens, as well as a home-base for illegal Jewish immigration missions and special ops against the British Mandate. The show debuted in 2020, and Shelbia stars as Ruth Hirsch.

Personal life
In 2019, she began dating American businessman Brandon Korff (son of Rabbi Yitzhak Aharon Korff, and grandson of billionaire Sumner Redstone).

In 2022, she began dating Israeli singer Omer Adam.

See also
List of Israelis
Women in the Israel Defense Forces

References

External links 

2001 births
Living people
Israeli female models
Israeli Sephardi Jews
Israeli Orthodox Jews
Jewish female models
People from Nahariya
Israeli Mizrahi Jews
Israeli people of Tunisian-Jewish descent
Israeli television actresses